The 2014 Northwestern Wildcats men's soccer team was the college's 35th season of playing organized men's college soccer.

Background 
In the 2013 season, Northwestern finished at the bottom of the conference standings. Despite this, the team won their first Big Ten Tournament game against Wisconsin before losing to Michigan State in the semifinal. Northwestern would go on to lose in the first round of the NCAA tournament against Bradley.

Roster

Competitions

Preseason

Regular season

Big Ten Standings

Match results

Big Ten Tournament

NCAA Tournament

Statistics

Transfers

See also 
2014 Big Ten Conference men's soccer season
2014 Big Ten Conference Men's Soccer Tournament
2014 NCAA Division I Men's Soccer Championship

References 

Northwestern
Northwestern Wildcats
Northwestern Wildcats
2014
Northwestern Wildcats